Poeltinula is a genus of lichenized fungi in the family Rhizocarpaceae.

The genus name of Poeltinula is in honour of Josef Poelt (1924-1995), who was a German-Austrian botanist (Bryology, Mycology and Lichenology) and was Professor of Systematic Botany at the Free University of Berlin in 1965.

The genus was circumscribed by Josef Hafellner in Nova Hedwigia Beih. vol.79 on page 330 in 1984.

The genus has 2 accepted species;
 Poeltinula cerebrina 
 Poeltinula cerebrinella 

Former species P. interjecta  is now a synonym of Melaspilea interjecta in the Melaspileaceae family.

References

Rhizocarpaceae
Lichen genera
Taxa named by Josef Hafellner